Mala is a fictional supervillain in the DC Comics universe who first appeared in Superman #65 (July 1950) in the story "The Three Supermen from Space!"

A female incarnation of Mala appeared in Superman: The Animated Series, voiced by Leslie Easterbrook in season two and Sara Douglas in season three.

Fictional character biography
Mala, along with his brothers Kizo and U-Ban, is a native of the planet Krypton, and a former member of the science council. Some years before Krypton exploded the trio attempts to take over the planet by threatening to remove all moisture from the atmosphere with one of their inventions. They are stopped by Superman's father Jor-El who places them in suspended animation and sends them into outer space, as an alternative to the death penalty.

Many years later their rocketship is struck by a piece of space debris, which brings the trio out of suspended animation. Mala and his brothers find their way to Earth, where they meet Superman. Once there, the three siblings constructed a machine that hypnotizes all of Earth's population. Superman manages to destroy the machine, but soon finds himself overwhelmed by the combined might of Mala and his brothers. The quick thinking Man of Steel tricks the brothers into fighting each other, until the trio are exhausted. Superman then places Mala and his brothers back into hibernation and sends them back into space.

In Action Comics #194 (Jul 1954), the three Kryptonians manage to escape again, after their rocket is once again struck by a piece of space debris. Kizo and U-Ban go to the planet Saturn (for a "vacation from trouble"), but Mala decides to get revenge on Superman. As Superman is off planet on a mission, Mala constructs a duplicate Earth in order to keep Superman out of the way. Mala, who looks exactly like Superman, decides to cause more problems for Superman by disguising himself as Clark Kent and then admitting to the public that she is Superman (never realizing that Superman really is Clark Kent).  

With his plan in place, Mala summons his brothers from Saturn and prepares to destroy Earth. Superman arrives and manages to trick the three evil Kryptonians into entering their space capsule, putting them back into suspended animation once again. This is the last appearance of Mala, Kizo, and U-Ban.

Powers and abilities
Mala, like all Kryptonians, has a number of inherent superpowers. These abilities are super strength, sonic speed, invulnerability, enhanced hearing, x-ray vision, and flight. Presumably, like Superman, Mala can only be harmed by Kryptonite. The DCAU version of Mala is a trained and ruthless fighter, which gives her an advantage over Superman in combat.

In other media

Television
 
A female incarnation of Mala appears in Superman: The Animated Series, voiced by Leslie Easterbrook in season two and Sarah Douglas in season three. This version is a trusted lieutenant and loyal partner of High General Jax-Ur who participated in his attempt to take over Krypton years prior until Jor-El foiled them and sentenced them to imprisonment in the Phantom Zone, with Mala being sentenced to 30 years due to her being a follower. In the two-part episode "Blasts From the Past", Superman discovers a Phantom Zone projector in his spaceship and communicates with Mala. Upon learning of her trial, he releases her. Initially disorientated by the loss of Krypton, Mala takes delight in her newfound powers and briefly joins Superman in fighting crime before quickly growing aggressive, destructive, and jealous of Lois Lane. Before long, Mala steals the projector, frees Jax-Ur, and destroys the projector so they can go on a rampage in Metropolis and fight Superman until Professor Hamilton builds a new projector and joins forces with Lane to send Mala and Jax-Ur back to the Phantom Zone. As of the episode "Absolute Power", Mala and Jax-Ur escaped the Phantom Zone via a space rift, were rescued by alien voyagers, and subjugated their planet. Despite learning of this, Superman initially chooses not to interfere until a rebel named Cetea reveals the tyrants' plans to invade Earth. Superman joins forces with a soldier named Alterus to lure Mala and Jax-Ur into space, where the latter pair are pulled into a black hole.

Video games
Mala appears as a boss in Superman 64. This version is a member of the Superman Revenge Squad.

Miscellaneous
 The Superman: The Animated Series incarnation of Mala appears in issues #7-8 of Superman Adventures. In her most notable appearance, she and Jax-Ur join forces with Argo City criminal General Zod.
 The Superman: The Animated Series incarnation of Mala appears in the Justice League Unlimited tie-in comic book as a member of General Zod's army who was sent to the Phantom Zone.

References

Comics characters introduced in 1950

Kryptonians
Characters created by Bruce Timm
DC Animated Universe characters
DC Comics extraterrestrial supervillains
DC Comics female supervillains
DC Comics characters who can move at superhuman speeds 
DC Comics characters with accelerated healing
DC Comics characters with superhuman senses
DC Comics characters with superhuman strength
Female characters in animation
Fictional characters with absorption or parasitic abilities
Fictional characters with air or wind abilities
Fictional characters with energy-manipulation abilities
Fictional characters with fire or heat abilities
Fictional characters with ice or cold abilities
Fictional characters with nuclear or radiation abilities
Fictional characters with slowed ageing
Fictional characters with superhuman durability or invulnerability
Fictional characters with X-ray vision